The 1967 Liège–Bastogne–Liège was the 53rd edition of the Liège–Bastogne–Liège cycle race and was held on 1 May 1967. The race started and finished in Liège. The race was won by Walter Godefroot of the Flandria team.

General classification

References

1967
1967 in Belgian sport
1967 Super Prestige Pernod